Wolf Mountain is an  mountain summit located in Park County, Montana.

Description

Wolf Mountain is located in the Beartooth Mountains, which are a subset of the Rocky Mountains. It is situated in the Absaroka-Beartooth Wilderness, on land managed by Custer National Forest. Wolf Mountain ranks as the 35th-highest summit in Montana, whereas the highest point in Montana, Granite Peak, rises five miles to the east. Precipitation runoff from the mountain drains into Clarks Creek and Glacier Creek which are tributaries of the Stillwater River. This geographical feature's name has been officially adopted by the United States Board on Geographic Names. The first known ascent of the summit was made in 1926 by Norman Clyde, one of the most-accomplished American mountaineers.

Climate

Based on the Köppen climate classification, Wolf Mountain is located in a subarctic climate zone characterized by long, usually very cold winters, and mild summers. Winter temperatures can drop below −10 °F with wind chill factors below −30 °F. This climate supports the Wolf Glacier in the east cirque.

See also
 Geology of the Rocky Mountains

References

External links
 Weather forecast: Wolf Mountain

Beartooth Mountains
Mountains of Montana
Mountains of Park County, Montana
North American 3000 m summits
Custer National Forest